Dirty Sole is an indie electronic dance music group, consisting of Daniel Anderegg and Richie Heller. The moniker was created by Richie, who wanted to make house music that sounded "dirty", but soulful. The group is based out of Chicago where they originally met, in 2001. Initially, they wrote several projects together before being noticed by Derrick Carter and Luke Solomon (Freaks) who signed them to their Classic Music Company record label. This release was widely acclaimed and topped UK Muzik dance charts at number five alongside Basement Jaxx and Roni Size.

History

1994-2001: The Beginning 

Dirty Sole had an experienced past before joining forces in 2001. Both artists came from a strong musical background, as Daniel was a keyboardist and drummer while Richie played the guitar and bass. Prior to their introduction, Daniel was working as a club DJ while Richie worked at Strictly Hype Recordings, the parent company for over a dozen recording labels, including Underground Construction and Afterhours.

2001-2009: Skattered Jazz 

After their initial success of Skattered Jazz, the duo recorded commercial work for Nike and Toyota Motor Corporation in a commercial starring Brad Pitt and followed up with singles on Yousef's Carioca imprint and Phil Weeks' Robsoul Recordings. During this time, Daniel also recorded under the guise of No Assembly Firm with acclaimed Chicago DJ Justin Long.

2009-2010: Dangerous Radio 

In 2009, Dirty Sole returned to the studio to collaborate with Foremost Poets to write their first full-length album. Initially the album was sold to Four Play Music, under the parent company EsNtion Records, who soon went into bankruptcy following the deal. This bankruptcy caused the album to get permanently shelved, until several singles saw new life in 2018 on Four Play Music.

2016: FWD Motion 

After a seven year hiatus, the group returned to the studio in 2016 to release a new album, entitled FWD Motion. This album features collaborations with Lyrics Born, Jon Von Letcher, Foremost Poets, Adam Pickrell and remixes from DFA Records artist James Curd (formerly of Greenskeepers) and Hannsen. The album was featured on a variety of digital outlets, including Hype Machine, Northern Transmissions, Enter The Venture, Jammerzine, High Clouds, Noise Porn, and The Deli Magazine. In additional review, Eat Sleep Breathe Music wrote that Dirty Sole "will vibe with listeners as soon as the first notes hit their ears".

2017-Present: The New Sound 

Following their FWD Motion album, the group has released a series of singles on Four Play Music and their own Dirty Sole Music imprint, in addition to placements with various commercial sync licensing outlets.

Discography 
What's Going On (2019)
Without You (2018)
She Saved My Life (2018)
It's Your Life (2018)
Blu Eyed Soul (Dirty Sole Remix) (2017)
Away (Dirty Sole Remix) (2016)
FWD Motion (2016)
Owning It (2016)
Driving (2016)
Lady (2016)
Dangerous Radio (2009)
Back In The Day (2008)
Humboldt Park EP (2008)
Cold Time Jazz (2005)
Skattered Jazz (2001)

References

External links 
 Dirty Sole - Official Website
 Dirty Sole - YouTube Page

Electronic dance music duos